Charles Read Seymour  (6 February 1855 — 6 November 1934) was an English first-class cricketer and barrister.

The son of the Reverend Charles Frederic Seymour, Rector of Winchfield, he was born at Winchfield in February 1855. He was educated at Harrow School, but did not play for the school cricket team. From there, he matriculated to Merton College, Oxford. A student of the Inner Temple, he was later called to the bar to practice as a barrister in 1880. Seymour made his debut in first-class cricket for the Marylebone Cricket Club (MCC) against Lancashire at Lord's in 1879. The following season, he played first-class cricket for Hampshire, making his debut for the county against the MCC at Lord's. He played first-class cricket for Hampshire until 1885, making fifteen appearances. In his fifteen matches, he scored 481 runs at an average of 18.50, making two half centuries with a highest score of 77 not out. Wisden described him as a "smart point" fielder, taking 12 catches. Despite Hampshire losing their first-class status at the end of the 1885 season, Seymour continued to play second-class county cricket for Hampshire until 1888. In later life, he was a justice of the peace for both Hampshire and Wiltshire. Seymour died at Winchester in November 1934. His brother-in-law was the cricketer Bernhard Bentinck.

References

External links

1855 births
1934 deaths
People from Hart District
People educated at Harrow School
Alumni of Merton College, Oxford
English cricketers
Marylebone Cricket Club cricketers
Members of the Inner Temple
English barristers
Hampshire cricketers
English justices of the peace